USS Seattle may refer to one of these United States Navy named in honor of the city of Seattle, Washington.

 , a  armored cruiser launched in 1905 as Washington; renamed Seattle in 1916; struck in 1946
 , a  launched in 1968; struck in 2005

United States Navy ship names